Giacomo Bazzan (13 January 1950 – 24 December 2019) was an Italian cyclist. He competed in the team pursuit event at the 1972 Summer Olympics.

References

External links
 

1950 births
2019 deaths
Italian male cyclists
Olympic cyclists of Italy
Cyclists at the 1972 Summer Olympics
Cyclists from the Province of Padua